Porto Grande Bay, also Mindelo Bay, is a bay on the north coast of the island of São Vicente, Cape Verde. The main city of São Vicente, Mindelo, is situated at the bay. The Porto Grande Bay is a natural harbour. It stretches between the headlands Ponta João Ribeiro in the northeast and Ponta do Morro Branco in the west. To the northwest it opens towards the Canal de São Vicente, the channel between the islands São Vicente and Santo Antão. The small rocky islet Ilhéu dos Pássaros lies north of the bay.

Port facilities
The port is owned and operated by ENAPOR, the Cape Verdean port authority. Since the latest modernization in 2014, the port has 4 long quays, 4 shorter quays, a quay for fishing boats with fish processing installations, a container terminal (expanded and modernized in 1997), 2 roll-on/roll-off ramps and 3 passenger terminals. The total length of the quays is 1,560 m, and the maximum depth is 12 m. With 847,602 metric tonnes of cargo and 350,213 passengers handled (2017), it is the busiest port of Cape Verde. There are ferry services to the islands of Santo Antão, São Nicolau, Santiago and Sal.

Gallery

References

External links

Photo of Porto Grande in 1948

Bays of Cape Verde
Geography of São Vicente, Cape Verde
Transport in São Vicente, Cape Verde
Ports and harbours of Cape Verde
Economy of Cape Verde
Mindelo